Navicat is a series of graphical database management and development software produced by  CyberTech Ltd. for MySQL, MariaDB, MongoDB, Oracle, SQLite, PostgreSQL and Microsoft SQL Server. It has an Explorer-like graphical user interface and supports multiple database connections for local and remote databases. Its design is made to meet the needs of a variety of audiences, from database administrators and programmers to various businesses/companies that serve clients and share information with partners.

History
The initial version of Navicat was developed by Mr. Ken Lin in 2001. The main target of the initial version was to simplify the management of MySQL installations. In 2008, Navicat for MySQL  was the winner of the Hong Kong ICT 2008 Award of the Year, Best Business Grand Award and Best Business (Product) Gold Award.

Supported platforms and languages
Navicat is a cross-platform tool and works on Microsoft Windows, Mac OS X and Linux platforms. Upon purchase, users are able to select a language for the software from eleven available languages: English, French, German, Spanish, Japanese, Polish, Russian, Portuguese, Korean, Simplified Chinese and Traditional Chinese.

It supports Linux platform via bundled Wine.

Versions

Standalone versions
Officially released in March 2002, the Windows version of Navicat for MySQL became the first product offered to the public by PremiumSoft. Subsequently, the company released two additional versions of Navicat for MySQL on the Mac OS X and Linux operating system in June and October 2003 respectively. In November 2013, added the support of MariaDB. PremiumSoft continued to expand their Navicat series by releasing Navicat for PostgreSQL for Windows in October 2005 and then for Mac OS X in June 2006. The Linux version of Navicat for PostgreSQL would not be released until 3 years later in August 2009. In August 2008 Navicat decided to further continue their product line and branch out into the Oracle community, creating Navicat for Oracle for Windows and Mac. In August of the following year they followed up with a version for the Linux Platform. The Oracle version of Navicat supports most of the latest Oracle objects features including Directory, Tablespace, Synonym, Materialized View, Trigger, Sequence, and Type, etc. Navicat for SQLite was released for Windows and Mac OS X simultaneously in April 2009, and the Linux version soon followed two months later in June of the same year. In April 2010, Navicat Premium began including Navicat for SQLite starting from version 9 to expand the usability of Navicat Premium. Navicat for SQL Server was released in November 2010 for the Windows platform and Mac OS X. Also at the release, the SQL server version was included in the Premium version of Navicat. In January 2011, support for SQL Azure was added. Navicat for MariaDB was released in November 2013 for Windows, Mac OS X and Linux. Also at the release, the MariaDB version was included in both Navicat Premium and Navicat for MySQL.

In 2018, Navicat started to support NoSQL databases. MongoDB is currently the newest addition to the list of server Navicat supports. The new line of product, called Navicat for MongoDB, was released in July 2018 for Windows, Mac OS X and Linux. It provides a native environment for MongoDB management and supports the extra features like MapReduce, GridFS Buckets. Also at the release, the MongoDB version was included in Navicat Premium.

Navicat Premium
In 2009, PremiumSoft released Navicat Premium, a series of Navicat software that combines all previous Navicat versions into a single version and can connect to different database types including MySQL, Oracle, and PostgreSQL simultaneously, allowing users to do data migration between cross databases. Navicat Premium version also supports cross-platform administration, serving Windows, Mac OS X and Linux. In April 2010, version 9 of Navicat Premium was released, which added the connectivity of SQLite database to Navicat Premium, allowing Navicat Premium to connect to MySQL, Oracle, PostgreSQL and SQLite in a single application. In November 2010, support for Microsoft SQL Server was added. In January 2011, SQL Azure was included. In November 2013, added the support of MariaDB. In July 2018, added the support of MongoDB.

Navicat Essentials
Navicat Essentials was officially released in November 2011. This is a simple Navicat version for commercial use. The Essentials editions of Navicat lack several features found in the Standard/Enterprise editions, including form view, record filtering, visual query building, data modeling and options for import, export and backup of data, etc.

Navicat Data Modeler
Navicat Data Modeler Windows version was officially released in March 2012. Then, Mac OS X and Linux version were released in May 2012 and June 2012. This is a standalone product for developers to create data models for MySQL, SQL Server, Oracle, PostgreSQL and SQLite databases. Navicat Data Modeler allows users to visually design database structures, perform reverse/forward engineer process, import table structures from ODBC data sources, generate SQL files and print models to files, etc. In June 2015, added the support of MariaDB databases and several features such as Model Conversion, Physical/Logical/Conceptual model types and Navicat Cloud.

Navicat iOS
In August 2013, PremiumSoft released a new product - Navicat iOS. It is a database administration tool developed for iOS with features included object viewer & designer, query builder & editor, Navicat Cloud, server monitor, etc. MySQL was supported in the first release. Then, Navicat for PostgreSQL iOS version was released in January 2015. In September 2017, Navicat for MariaDB iOS version was released.

Navicat Cloud Collaboration
Navicat Cloud is a cloud service for users to synchronize their connection settings, queries, models and virtual groups with multiple platforms and devices. A user can share his project to others for collaborating on connection settings, queries and models.

Navicat Monitor
Navicat Monitor was officially released in April 2018. It is a safe, simple and agentless remote server monitoring tool and supports to monitor MySQL, MariaDB and cloud databases. Users can access Navicat Monitor from anywhere via a web browser. The main features of Navicat Monitor including real-time instance performance monitoring, alert notification, query analyzer, replications monitoring.

Features
Navicat's features include:

 code snippet
 visual query-builder
 SSH and HTTP tunneling
 data and structure migration and synchronization
 import and export and backup of data
 report builder
 data modeling
 task scheduling and wizards tool

There are differences in the features available across operating systems.

Navicat is also compatible with forks of MySQL such as Drizzle, OurDelta, and Percona.

Navicat supports Cloud Databases like Amazon RDS, Amazon Aurora, Amazon Redshift, SQL Azure, Oracle Cloud, Google Cloud and Alibaba Cloud.

Navicat Community
Navicat Community provides a flexible environment for Navicat users to post questions, share experiences and solutions. It includes forum discussions, blog articles, tutorial videos and Wiki FAQ.

See also
Comparison of database tools

References

External links

 Navicat Community

MySQL
PostgreSQL
Database administration tools
Data modeling tools
Software companies of Hong Kong
Oracle database tools
Microsoft database software
MariaDB